The Ghost in the Garret is a 1921 American silent comedy film directed by F. Richard Jones and written by Fred Chaston and Wells Hastings. The film stars Dorothy Gish, Downing Clarke, Mrs. David Landau, William Parke Jr., Ray Grey, Walter P. Lewis, and Mary Foy. The film was released in February 1921, by Paramount Pictures. It is presumed to be a lost film. Dorothy Gish was the younger sister of the celebrated actress Lillian Gish, although she never became as popular as her sister.

Plot
Delsie O'Gill (Dorothy Gish) visits the home of her aunt and uncle, during which time her aunt's $75,000 necklace is stolen. Delsie attempts to get back the necklace and traces it to a supposedly haunted house in the area. She pretends to be a ghost in order to frighten the thieves into giving up the necklace.

Cast 
Dorothy Gish as Delsie O'Dell
Downing Clarke as Gilbert Dennison
Mrs. David Landau as Dennison's wife
William Parke Jr. as Bill Clark
Ray Grey as Oscar White
Walter P. Lewis as Dennison's butler
Mary Foy as Dennison's cook
Frank Badgley as Det. O'Connor
Frank Hagney as Crook
Tom Blake as Crook
William Nally as Crook
Porter Strong as Crook

Reviews
Critic Troy Howarth commented "Prolific silent film director F. Richard Jones was responsible for this stale old dark house comedy-thriller.....(the film) brought nothing new to the genre and seemed awfully clichéd to even 1921's critics....basically a lighthearted affair."

References

External links 

 

 Film stills at doctormacro.com

1921 films
1920s English-language films
Silent American comedy films
1921 comedy films
Paramount Pictures films
Films directed by F. Richard Jones
American black-and-white films
Lost American films
American silent feature films
1921 lost films
Lost comedy films
1920s American films